Sibylle Rauch (born 14 June 1960) is a German former film actress, nude model and pornographic actress.

Life and career 
She was born Erika Roswitha Rauch in Munich, Germany. She was the Playmate of June 1979 in the German edition of Playboy, and appeared fifteen more times. She also appeared on several films, most notably starring the main role in several chapters of the Israeli film series Eskimo Limon. In 1982 she debuted as a singer, with the single "So Long, Goodbye / Playmate".

She entered the adult industry in 1987, accepting a 100,000 Mark salary offered by the former porn actress and then producer Teresa Orlowski to star in the two-parts pornographic film Born for Love. She later appeared in more than 20 pornographic films.

Her real life events inspired the 2001 two-parts RTL TV movie Das sündige Mädchen; her role was played by Anna Loos.

In 2004 she was heavily injured by the performance artist Marko König during the rehearsal of a stage show.

In 2012 she appeared in a series of commercial shorts promoting the company "GogoMil".

See also
 List of German actors
 List of pornographic actors

References

External links

1960 births
Living people
German pornographic film actresses
German female adult models
German women singers
Actresses from Munich
German film actresses
Ich bin ein Star – Holt mich hier raus! participants